The 1978 Maine gubernatorial election took place on November 7, 1978. Incumbent Independent Governor James B. Longley had promised to not seek a second term when he was elected in 1974, and held true to his pledge.  Former State Senator Joseph E. Brennan of the Democratic Party defeated both challenger Republican Linwood E. Palmer Jr. and Independent candidate Herman Frankland. Richard Carey unsuccessfully ran for the Democratic nomination, while Charles Cragin unsuccessfully ran for the Republican nomination.

Results

Notes

1978
Gubernatorial
Maine
November 1978 events in the United States